Couderay is a village in Sawyer County, Wisconsin, United States, along the Couderay River. The population was 88 at the 2010 census. The village is located within the Town of Couderay.

Couderay is home to Al Capone's northwoods hideaway, a tourist site called "The Hideout."  The Hideout was purchased in the spring of 2010 by the Lac Courte Oreilles Indian Tribe after bankruptcy hearings for the previous owners.

Name origin
Couderay is a truncated name of French origin denoting the term "short ears" (courtes oreilles) in connection with those of the Ojibwa people.  French explorers and French-Canadian trappers who roamed the northern part of French Louisiana and the Great Lakes at the time of New France created this name.

Geography

Weather
On February 2, and February 4, 1996, the temperature fell to −55 °F (−48 °C), the coldest temperature ever recorded in Wisconsin.

Demographics

2010 census
As of the census of 2010, there were 88 people, 35 households, and 20 families living in the village. The racial makeup of the village was 73.9% White, 12.5% Native American, 1.1% from other races, and 12.5% from two or more races. Hispanic or Latino of any race were 1.1% of the population.

There were 35 households, of which 20.0% had children under the age of 18 living with them, 57.1% were married couples living together, and 42.9% were non-families. 28.6% of all households were made up of individuals, and 14.3% had someone living alone who was 65 years of age or older. The average household size was 2.29 and the average family size was 2.80.

The median age in the village was 45.5 years. 15.9% of residents were under the age of 18; 4.5% were between the ages of 18 and 24; 28.4% were from 25 to 44; 34.2% were from 45 to 64; and 17% were 65 years of age or older. The gender makeup of the village was 55.7% male and 44.3% female.

2000 census
As of the census of 2000, there were 96 people, 40 households, and 26 families living in the village. The population density was 99.2 people per square mile (38.2/km2). There were 54 housing units at an average density of 55.8 per square mile (21.5/km2). The racial makeup of the village was 79.17% White, 19.79% Native American, 1.04% from other races. 1.04% of the population were Hispanic or Latino of any race.

There were 40 households, out of which 30.0% had children under the age of 18 living with them, 55.0% were married couples living together, 5.0% had a female householder with no husband present, and 35.0% were non-families. 27.5% of all households were made up of individuals, and 15.0% had someone living alone who was 65 years of age or older. The average household size was 2.40 and the average family size was 2.88.

In the village, the population was spread out, with 21.9% under the age of 18, 11.5% from 18 to 24, 20.8% from 25 to 44, 28.1% from 45 to 64, and 17.7% who were 65 years of age or older. The median age was 41 years. For every 100 females, there were 128.6 males. For every 100 females age 18 and over, there were 120.6 males.

The median income for a household in the village was $40,417, and the median income for a family was $41,042. Males had a median income of $33,750 versus $9,750 for females. The per capita income for the village was $14,008. There were 6.1% of families and 11.4% of the population living below the poverty line, including no under eighteens and 41.2% of those over 64.

References

External links
 www.couderaywisconsin.com

Villages in Sawyer County, Wisconsin
Villages in Wisconsin